En stilla flirt (A Quiet Flirt) is a Swedish romantic comedy film from 1934. It is the Swedish-language version of a twin production with the 1933 Norwegian-language version En stille flirt. It is based on the novel Min knapphullsblomst (The Flower in My Buttonhole) by Edith Øberg. It was distributed by the company Svensk Filmindustri. The screenplay was written by Gösta Stevens and the film was directed by Gustaf Molander. It is 95 minutes long. The Norwegian actress Tutta Rolf played the female lead in both versions of the film.

Cast
Tutta Rolf as Diddi Werner
Ernst Eklund as Doctor Gunnar Green
Margit Manstad as Sally Garbel
Einar Axelsson as Henry Wallé
Thor Modéen as Swanson
Carl-Gunnar Wingård as Gründer
Steinar Jøraandstad as Dr. Gerhardt
Benkt-Åke Benktsson as Mr. Wilder
Gull Natorp as Mrs. Wilder
Julia Cæsar as Aunt Amalia
Lotten Olsson as Aunt Lotten

References

External links 
 
 En stilla flirt at The Swedish Film Database

1934 films
Swedish black-and-white films
Films directed by Gustaf Molander
1930s Swedish-language films
1930s Swedish films